In mathematics, a quantum or quantized enveloping algebra is a q-analog of a universal enveloping algebra. The notation was introduced by Drinfeld and independently by Jimbo.

Among the applications, studying the  limit led to the discovery of crystal bases.

The case of  

Michio Jimbo considered the algebras with three generators related by the three commutators

When , these reduce to the commutators that define the special linear Lie algebra .

See also 
quantum group

References

External links 
 Quantized enveloping algebra at the nLab
 Does there exist any "quantum Lie algebra" imbedded into the quantum enveloping algebra ? at MathOverflow

Quantum groups
Representation theory
Mathematical quantization